La Scala Concert 03.03.03 is a 2003 Live album by Italian pianist and composer Ludovico Einaudi.  As the title suggests it is a recording of a concert at the La Scala opera house in Milan, Italy on 3 March 2003.

Track listing

Ludovico Einaudi albums
2004 live albums
2004 classical albums